Rajika Priyanganee Wickramasinghe (born 5 August 1973) is a Sri Lankan politician and Member of Parliament.

Wickramasinghe was born on 5 August 1973. She contested the 2015 parliamentary election as one of the United People's Freedom Alliance (UPFA) electoral alliance's candidates in Kegalle District but failed to get elected after coming 5th amongst the UPFA candidates. She contested the 2020 parliamentary election as a Sri Lanka People's Freedom Alliance electoral alliance candidate in Kegalle District and was elected to the Parliament of Sri Lanka.

References

1973 births
Living people
Members of the 16th Parliament of Sri Lanka
Sinhalese politicians
Sri Lankan Buddhists
Sri Lanka People's Freedom Alliance politicians
Sri Lanka Podujana Peramuna politicians
United People's Freedom Alliance politicians
Women legislators in Sri Lanka